Yehezkel is the Hebrew name of the biblical prophet known in Western culture as Ezekiel.

Yehezkel may refer to:

Given name
Yehezkel Abramsky (1886–1976), Russian-born British Orthodox rabbi
Yehezkel Braun (1922–2014), Israeli composer
Yehezkel Chazom (born 1947), Israeli footballer
Yehezkel Dror (born 1928), Israeli political scientist
Yehezkel Flomin (1935–2019), Likud politician
Yehezkel Hen (1882–1952), Mapai politician
Yehezkel Kaufmann (1889–1963), Israeli philosopher
Yehezkel Lazarov (born 1974), Israeli actor
Yehezkel Nafshy (born 1977), Israeli poet
Yehezkel Streichman (1906–1993), Israeli painter
Yehezkel Zakai (born 1932), Israeli left-wing politician

Surname
Avi Yehezkel (born 1958), Israeli Labor Party politician
Nissan Yehezkel (born 1971), Israeli football manager
Sagiv Yehezkel (born 1995), Israeli footballer

See also
Ezekiel (disambiguation)
Kfar Yehezkel, moshav ovdim in the Jezreel Valley